Recordon is a surname. Notable people with the surname include:

Benjamin Recordon (1845–1948), Swiss architect
David Recordon (born 1986), American web developer
Frédéric Recordon (1811–1889), Swiss physician and ophthalmologist
Lionel Recordon (1907–1988), British cricketer
Luc Recordon (born 1955), Swiss politician